Neboglamine (developmental code names CR-2249, XY-2401), formerly known as nebostinel, is a positive allosteric modulator of the glycine site of the NMDA receptor which is under investigation for Rottapharm for the treatment of schizophrenia and cocaine dependence. It shows cognition- and memory-enhancing effects in animal models. As of June 2015, it is in phase II clinical trials for both schizophrenia and cocaine abuse.

See also 
 List of investigational antipsychotics

References

External links 
 Nebostinel - AdisInsight

Amino acids
Antipsychotics
NMDA receptor agonists
Nootropics